Overleek is a hamlet in North Holland, in the municipality of Waterland, close to Monnickendam.

Overleek is not a statistical entity, and the postal authorities have placed it under Monnickendam. It consists of about 30 houses.

References 

Populated places in North Holland
Waterland